Jonas Plass (born 1 August 1986 in Bamberg) is a German athlete who competes in the sprint with a personal best time of 46.00 seconds over the 400 metres.

Plass won the bronze medal at the 2012 European Athletics Championships in Helsinki in the 4 × 400 metres relay.

External links 
 

1986 births
Living people
Sportspeople from Bamberg
German male sprinters
German national athletics champions
Athletes (track and field) at the 2012 Summer Olympics
Olympic athletes of Germany
European Athletics Championships medalists